Sofie Pintens (born 2 October 1974) is a former Belgian female short track speed skater. She competed at the 1994 Winter Olympics.

Sofie Pintens is the younger sister of Bea Pintens.

References 

1974 births
Living people
Belgian female short track speed skaters
Olympic short track speed skaters of Belgium
Short track speed skaters at the 1994 Winter Olympics